Bellevigne-les-Châteaux is a commune in the Maine-et-Loire department in western France. It was established on 1 January 2019 by merger of the former communes of Chacé (the seat), Brézé and Saint-Cyr-en-Bourg.

See also
Communes of the Maine-et-Loire department

References

Communes of Maine-et-Loire